Rolando González Ortega (born 26 January 1993) is a Mexican professional footballer who plays as a defender for Atlante.

Honours
Atlante
Liga de Expansión MX: Apertura 2021, Apertura 2022
Campeón de Campeones: 2022

External links
 
 

Living people
1993 births
Mexican footballers
Association football midfielders
Altamira F.C. players
Cafetaleros de Chiapas footballers
Alebrijes de Oaxaca players
Tampico Madero F.C. footballers
Ascenso MX players
Liga Premier de México players
Tercera División de México players
Footballers from Tamaulipas